Riverside is an unincorporated community in Malheur County, Oregon, United States. It is northeast of Crane and south of Juntura along Juntura–Riverside Road and the South Fork Malheur River near its confluence with the main stem.

The Riverside Wildlife Area, managed by the Oregon Department of Fish and Wildlife, is along the Malheur River canyon near Riverside. Encompassing , it provides public access to fishing, hunting, and wildlife viewing in a remote area that is otherwise privately owned.

Riverside post office was established in 1889, with Teresa E. McRae as postmaster. The office, with a ZIP code of 97917, was discontinued in 2008.

Climate
Riverside has a steppe climate (BSk) according to the Köppen climate classification system.

References

Ontario, Oregon micropolitan area
Unincorporated communities in Malheur County, Oregon
Unincorporated communities in Oregon